The 2022 PalmerBet Queensland Darts Masters was the first staging of the tournament by the Professional Darts Corporation, and the fourth entry in the 2022 World Series of Darts. The tournament featured 16 players (eight 'elite' PDC players and eight regional qualifiers) and was held at the Townsville Entertainment and Convention Centre in Townsville, Australia on 12–13 August 2022.

 won his 17th World Series title after defeating  8–5 in the final.

Prize money
The total prize fund remained at £60,000.

Qualifiers
The PDC announced 6 of the 8 players who would be their representatives at the event on 11 April 2022, including Fallon Sherrock, who was denied her chance to appear on the 2020 World Series of Darts circuit, owing to the COVID-19 pandemic. On 30 May 2022, it was announced that Jonny Clayton and Joe Cullen would complete the field of PDC representatives.

On 27 July, it was announced that  had withdrawn from the three Oceania events for medical reasons, and so was replaced by the current World Series Order of Merit leader .

The seedings were based on the World Series Order of Merit following the first 3 events.

  (quarter-finals)
  (quarter-finals)
  (first round)
  (champion)
  (runner-up)
  (first round)
  (first round)
  (semi-finals)

The Oceanic qualifiers consisted of their three PDC Tour Card holders (Damon Heta, Simon Whitlock and Gordon Mathers), plus the four Australian players who won the DPA qualifiers, along with one New Zealand player from the DPNZ qualifier.

Draw

References

Queensland Darts Masters
Queensland Darts Masters
World Series of Darts
Queensland Darts Masters